In mathematics, and in particular functional analysis, the tensor product of Hilbert spaces is a way to extend the tensor product construction so that the result of taking a tensor product of two Hilbert spaces is another Hilbert space. Roughly speaking, the tensor product is the metric space completion of the ordinary tensor product. This is an example of a topological tensor product. The tensor product allows Hilbert spaces to be collected into a symmetric monoidal category.

Definition

Since Hilbert spaces have inner products, one would like to introduce an inner product, and therefore a topology, on the tensor product that arise naturally from those of the factors. Let  and  be two Hilbert spaces with inner products  and  respectively. We can turn this vector space tensor product into an inner product space by defining

and extending by linearity. Finally, take the completion under this inner product.

Explicit construction

The tensor product can also be defined without appealing to the metric space completion.

where  is an arbitrary orthonormal basis of 

Universal property

The Hilbert tensor product  is characterized by the following universal property :

A weakly Hilbert-Schmidt mapping  is defined as a bilinear map for which a real number  exists, such that 
 

As with any universal property, this characterizes the tensor product H uniquely, up to isomorphism. The same universal property, with obvious modifications, also applies for the tensor product of any finite number of Hilbert spaces. It is essentially the same universal property shared by all definitions of tensor products, irrespective of the spaces being tensored: this implies that any space with a tensor product is a symmetric monoidal category, and Hilbert spaces are a particular example thereof.

Infinite tensor products

Operator algebras

This is one advantage of the "algebraic" method in quantum statistical mechanics.

Properties

If  and  have orthonormal bases  and  respectively, then  is an orthonormal basis for  In particular, the Hilbert dimension of the tensor product is the product (as cardinal numbers) of the Hilbert dimensions.

Examples and applications

The following examples show how tensor products arise naturally.

Similarly, we can show that , denoting the space of square integrable functions  is isomorphic to  if this space is separable.

Tensor products of Hilbert spaces arise often in quantum mechanics.

References

Bibliography

 .
 .

Functional analysis
Hilbert space
Linear algebra
Operator theory
Topological tensor products